|}

The Top Novices' Hurdle is a Grade One National Hunt hurdle race in Great Britain which is open to horses aged four years or older. It is run at Aintree over a distance of about 2 miles and half a furlong (2 miles and 103 yards, or 3,313 metres), and during its running there are nine hurdles to be jumped. The race is for novice hurdlers, and it is scheduled to take place each year during the Grand National meeting in early April.

The field usually includes horses which ran previously in the Supreme Novices' Hurdle, and the last to achieve victory in both events was Browne's Gazette in 1984.
The Top Novices' Hurdle was upgraded to Grade One by the British Horseracing Authority from its 2016 running.

Winners

See also
 Horse racing in Great Britain
 List of British National Hunt races

References

 Racing Post:

 aintree.co.uk – 2010 John Smith's Grand National Media Guide.
 pedigreequery.com – Top Novices' Hurdle – Aintree.

National Hunt races in Great Britain
Aintree Racecourse
National Hunt hurdle races